Eskiköy (literally "old village" in Turkish) may refer to one of the following places in Turkey:

 Eskiköy, Acıpayam
 Eskiköy, Çorum
 Eskiköy, Baskil
 Eskiköy, İnegöl
 Eskiköy, İskilip
 Eskiköy, Kalecik, a village in Ankara Province
 Eskiköy, Silvan
 Eskiköy, Sincik, a village in Adıyaman Province